Newgen or New Gen or New-gen may refer to:

 NEW-GEN, superhero comic book series
 New Gen Airways, airline based in Thailand
 New Generation Pictures, visual media production company

See also 
 Nextgen
 New Generation (disambiguation)